is a Japanese shōjo manga series written and illustrated by Arina Tanemura. The Gentlemen's Alliance Cross premiered in the September 2004 issue of Ribon, running until the June 2008 
issue. The 47 chapters were collected and published in 11 tankōbon volumes by Shueisha. The series is licensed for English language release in North America by Viz Media which published the first volume on March 6, 2007. The eleventh and final volume was released in English in April 2010. In this fictional work, a 15-year-old student was sold by her father to another family.

Plot 
Haine Otomiya, a 15-year-old high school student at the elite private Imperial Academy (帝国学園 Teikoku Gakuen), was apparently sold to the Otomiya family by her father, Kazuhito Kamiya, for 50 million yen. Disoriented with her place in life, she became a gang member until she met Shizumasa Tōgū, who told her to live life how she wanted to. Recognizing Shizumasa as the author of a treasured picture book given to her from father, Haine reformed herself and entered the Imperial Academy to try and win his love.

However, Shizumasa is the Emperor of the school, the sole Gold rank student as the admired President of the Student Council. Through various circumstances, the Bronze-ranked Haine is tricked into becoming Shizumasa's bodyguard and assigned the special rank of Platinum - which designates her as the Koutei's companion. To Haine's surprise and disappointment, Shizumasa claims not to know her and acts coldly toward her. Still determined to win his love, she soon learns that the Koutei is not Shizumasa, but his twin brother Takanari. In the brothers' childhood, Shizumasa won the right to be recognized as the heir to the prestigious Tōgū family, which left Takanari to become his brother's "shadow" and was reported to have died. Because Shizumasa is sickly, Takanari is forced to assume Shizumasa's identity and reluctantly falls in love with Haine. Their relationship is strained by Haine's uncertainty as to whether she loves Shizumasa, whose kind words saved her during her darkest crisis of identity, or Takanari, who is revealed to be the author of her beloved story book. In the end, she decides to marry Takanari.

Characters

Student Council 

 
Haine is a fifteen-year-old student at the Imperial Academy who is enlisted to become the bodyguard of the student council president and given the platinum ranking. Out of disillusionment with her new step-family, Haine became a delinquent in 9th grade under the nickname "Seashore Cinderella." However, Shizumasa inspires her to change her ways. Tanemura stated that she picked the character for "ash" in her name as a reference to Cinderella.

Takanari is a student at the Imperial Academy and the emperor of the student council. Takanari is cold and distant, but after meeting Haine, he becomes kinder and later falls in love with her.

Shizumasa is a student at the Imperial Academy and the emperor of the student council. He has had leukemia from a young age, and his older twin brother, Takanari, is forced to make public appearances under his identity. 

Ushio is Haine's best friend. Despite finding boys repulsive, she is popular with them and is given the nickname . Having known Haine since their delinquent days, she is very protective of her and joins the student council as their secretary to be with her. Ushio is in love with Haine, but she soon realizes that the only reason why she was so attached to her was because she didn't think anyone else would accept her. When Senri does so, however, she discovers that she has fallen in love with him.

The treasurer and brains of the Student Council. Maora is actually a male, his real name being Yoshitaka Ichinomiya, and is childhood friends with Maguri.

The vice president of the Student Council and Takanari's best friend.

Other families 

 

The former Emperor of the student council and secret boyfriend of Maika.

 

Itsuki's wife, and claims she fell in love with him at first sight. Before her marriage to Itsuki, Ryouka had already been married and had a son, Kusame, though her first husband is now deceased. She is a cheerful woman who likes to tease both her son and Haine, whom she cares for like her own daughter.

 

Haine's stepbrother and Itsuki's stepson, Kusame is the heir to the Otomiya family. Secretly in love with Haine. Kusame is an honor student and vice president of Imperial Academy Junior section's Student Council.

 

Kazuhito is married to Maika, Haine's mother. Kazuhito was originally the Vice Chairman of the Student Council when he was at the Imperial Academy while Itsuki was the Emperor. 

 

Maika is married to Kazuhito and mother to Haine, Komaki, and Tachibana. Originally the secret girlfriend of Itsuki Otomiya.

 

Komaki is Haine's biological little sister from the Kamiya family. She posed as Takanari ("Shizumasa") Tōgū's fiancée to protect Haine from being sent back to their father. Though proper and lady-like, she tends to have her moments of outburst. 

 

Tachibana is Haine's biological little brother. 

 
Shouka is the biological mother of Shizumasa and Takanari. 

 
Kasuga is, surprisingly, Takanari and Shizumasa's cousin. She is a member of Haine's old gang (Dark Mermaid), and she admitted that she was the most disappointed when Haine left. 

Shizumasa and Takanari's mother, the older identical twin sister of their biological mother, Shouka. Kyouka is apparently away on business on a frequent basis, so neither Takanari or Shizumasa see her often.  

 
Takanari's servant and one of his best friends. Takanari once said that Touya is "the only person who understands me." He has a calm nature, and cares much about Takanari's happiness. He is very polite, gets nervous easily, and is friends with Riiko.

 
Caretaker of the real Shizumasa.

 

The school physician, who loves cute high school girls. He is a butler of the Tōgū family and is especially interested in Ushio, which in later chapters he says is because she looks exactly like Shouka.

School staff 

 

The warden and principal at Imperial Academy, and a friend of Haine and the Postman.

Media

Manga 
Written and illustrated by Arina Tanemura, The Gentlemen's Alliance Cross premiered in the September 2004 issue of Ribon where it ran for 47 chapters until its conclusion in the June 2008 issue. The individual chapters were collected and published in 11 tankōbon volumes by Shueisha. Tanemura had named the series after the song "Shinshi Dōmei" by Hiroko Yakushimaru but added the word "cross" at the end.

The series is licensed for English language release in North America by Viz Media which published the first volume on March 6, 2007; eleven volumes have been released as of April 2010. It is licensed in France by Kana.

Starting in June 2015, The Gentlemen's Alliance Cross was reprinted in seven bunkoban volumes with new covers.

|}

Dōjinshi

Under the pseudonym "Meguro Teikoku", Tanemura has also self-published unofficial dōjinshi of the series and sold limited copies exclusively at Comiket in December 2014.

Artbook 
In June 2008, Shueisha published an artbook for the series entitled . In 2009, Viz Media acquired the license for its English language release, and subsequently published the book in November 2009.

Drama CD 
In 2004, Shueisha released drama CD adaptation of the first chapter along with Cactus's Secret, as a mail-order gift in the December 2004 issue of Ribon.

Reception 
Several volumes of The Gentlemen's Alliance Cross made the Tohan and Oricon manga charts in Japan: volume nine placed 7th in the week January 15–21, the regular edition of volume 10 was tenth in the week of May 13–19, and both the regular and special editions of volume 11 were on the list for November 11–17, in 4th place and 27th place respectively (selling 78,895 copies combined). The regular edition of volume 11 stayed on the charts for the next week (November 18–25), but went from 4th to 20th place.

According to Publishers Weekly, Viz Media's English release was the seventh best selling comic in April 2007 and the third volume was the eighth bestseller in October 2007.  The series ranked 8th in BookScan's list of top 20 American properties in the third quarter of 2008 and was one of the top 50 manga sellers in the time period from the start of May through the middle of July. The fourth volume of the series sold 1075 copies in December 2007, making it the 96th best-selling graphic novel for that month. Four other volumes each made the top 20 list of graphic novels during the month of release: volume 5 ranked sixth in March 2008, volume 6 ranked number 9 in June 2008, volume 7 ranked 8 in September 2008, and volume 8 was ranked 18th in December 2008. Volume 10 debuted at number 9 on the New York Times Manga Best Seller List for the week of October 18–24, a week before its official release date of November 3. The final volume of the series debuted at number 4 on the New York Times Manga Best Seller list for the week of April 4–10. The Gentlemen's Alliance Cross was ranked 16th in a list of the top 25 Manga Properties of 2008 by ICv2. The series was ranked as the 6th top shōjo property, as well as the 18th over-all manga property, in America for the first quarter of 2009.

References

External links 
 Official Viz The Gentlemen's Alliance Cross website
 Official Shojo Beat The Gentlemen's Alliance Cross website
 

2004 manga
Comedy-drama anime and manga
Shōjo manga
Shueisha manga
Viz Media manga